"Good Thing" is a song by German music producer Zedd and American singer and songwriter Kehlani, released on 27 September 2019 through Interscope Records. The track was written by Zedd and Kehlani with Cleo Tighe, Starsmith and Lost Boy.

Promotion
Zedd and Kehlani posted a picture of themselves in a studio in August 2019, which led to rumours of a collaboration. Zedd officially announced the collaboration on 20 September, sharing a snippet of the track on social media.

Charts

References

2019 singles
2019 songs
Zedd songs
Kehlani songs
Songs written by Zedd
Songs written by Cleo Tighe
Songs written by Kehlani
Songs written by Starsmith
Song recordings produced by Starsmith

Music videos directed by Warren Fu
Songs written by Peter Rycroft